Legislative elections were held in France on 29 February and 14 March 1852, electing the first legislature of the French Second Empire.

Emperor Napoleon III's Bonapartists won a huge majority consisting of 258 of the 261 seats (five Royalists allied with the Bonapartists). The Party of Order that had won a majority in the 1849 election was banned following their opposition to the 1851 coup by President Louis Napoleon Bonaparte.

Results

References
Roi et President

Legislative elections in France
France
Legislative